Aşağıbağdere is a village in the District of Nallıhan, Ankara Province, Turkey. Its economy is based on agriculture and livestock.

Aşağıbağdere is 191 km from the city of Ankara.

References

Villages in Nallıhan District